Widding is a Scandinavian surname. Notable people with the surname include:

 Astrid Söderbergh Widding (born 1963), Swedish academic
 Elsa Widding (born 1968), Swedish politician
 Lars Widding (1924–1994), Swedish author and journalist

Surnames of Scandinavian origin